Thelma Mae Harper (nee Crowley), better known as Mama, is a fictional character played by American actress Vicki Lawrence. Mama is a purse-lipped, thickset senior citizen in her mid-to-late 60s. She has lived in an unspecified part of the Southern United States called "Raytown" for her entire life, evident from the southern drawl of her speech and customs. Mama is an exaggerated version of a prototypical middle twentieth century lower middle class grandmother in the United States South. The character was originally created for Carol Burnett, however, Burnett preferred to play Mama's daughter Eunice Harper Higgins, resulting in Mama as Lawrence's claim to fame.

The Mama character first appeared in "The Family" sketches on The Carol Burnett Show (1974–1978) and Carol Burnett & Company (1979); followed by Eunice (a 1982 made-for-TV movie expanding on "The Family" sketches); then peaking as lead character on Mama's Family (first on NBC 1983–84, then revolutionized in first-run syndication 1986–1990); and finally in Lawrence's ongoing untelevised stand-up comedy routine, Vicki Lawrence & Mama: A Two-Woman Show since 2001. 

With Lawrence continuing to play the role into the present day, Mama has also made numerous other post-television show guest appearances, such as on Hollywood Squares; The Talk; "Larry the Cable Guy's Christmas Spectacular" (2007); "Betty White's 2nd Annual 90th Birthday" (February 5, 2013); The Queen Latifah Show (May 20, 2014); etc. In the late 1970s, Vicki appeared as Mama along with her daughter, Eunice (portrayed by Burnett), in an episode of Password Plus.

In her autobiography, Vicki called Thelma "the only role which I got to go to makeup to get ugly!" It is Lawrence's most well-known role.

Mama character timeline (1970s–present)
Carol Burnett was originally intended to play the "Mama" character while Lawrence was to play her daughter, but because of Burnett's desire to swap roles, Lawrence played Mama. 

In the seventh season of The Carol Burnett Show in 1974, "The Family" skit was created, which debuted the "Mama" role. Becoming a major hit with audiences, Lawrence ended up performing the character on The Carol Burnett Shows The Family for the final 5 seasons of the show's 11 season run. Four years after The Carol Burnett show ended, the TV-movie-special Eunice (the character of Mama's daughter) was broadcast. The special included the key characters from "The Family" sketches, including Mama. The skit was spun off again with a sitcom that surrounded the "Mama" character. Mama's Family has two contrasting incarnations. This is as result of the show's cancellation from NBC after one and a half seasons (1983 to 1984) and its subsequent high ratings in reruns. In 1986, the program was relaunched in first-run syndication, where it enjoyed a successful revival through to its series finale in 1990.

By the "Mama" character's full development on the second life of Mama's Family, Thelma had spent much of her time tending to the housework and nurturance of her loved ones, constantly engaged in cooking, cleaning, and providing loving support to her family. She ruled the roost with a smart mouth and snappy retorts; an explosively quick temper; and a brash, rough and abrasive manner. Mama often relaxed with a can of beer, and when taking exception with something or someone, a purse whack, hand slam, object slam, shove, startling shout, or a healthy dose of wisecracking insults and criticisms at the source of her irritation and displeasure.

Appearance
Mama's appearance is based on that of a stereotypical elderly woman. She is a thickset, pursed-lipped widow, with silvery blue curls. All of her outfits have consisted of various short-sleeved, floral-print dresses that carry lace collars. As much of Mama's time on Mama's Family was spent cooking and cleaning, her dresses were often worn with an overlapping apron. Mama's lower legs have been clasped by visible support hose since the outset of Mama's Family; she wore no support hose during "The Family" sketches, but was seen in them by the Eunice movie. For footwear, Mama regularly wore white orthopedic, colonial shoes that took an oxford heels style.

Mama regularly wore a few fashion accessories, including a white pearl necklace and white pearl earrings as well as a wristwatch. 
 
Mama's outerwear worn when visiting public venues always consisted of the same purple sweater, draped casually over her shoulders without arms in the sleeves; headpieces made completely of artificial plant petals; and a white purse, which she didn't hesitate to use as a weapon when given the opportunity.

Mama's persona

Character development and evolution
The character of "Mama" was originally based, at least in part, on the relationship between Carol Burnett's mother and grandmother and was intended to be a maternal, elderly version of Eunice. Lawrence has noted that she also used her southern ex-mother-in-law and her own grandmother from Missouri in the genesis of Mama.

The persona of the "Mama" character was redeveloped for Mama's Family after the character's inception on The Family skits. Lawrence recognized the modifications early on and disapproved. She has revealed that she originally found the softening of the "Mama" character to be unfunny. However, Lawrence has stated that after counsel about the character needing reshaping to fit sitcom television from Harvey Korman (played the "Ed" character), she came to accept and later embrace the adjusted version of Mama. She has stated that to this day, she appreciates how the character has "blossomed" and "matured" from "The Family" sketches. The original writers of the character had based Mama on their real-life family members and thus disapproved of the adjustments.

Mama's catch phrases
Unlike the sketches and the television movie, Mama had several catch phrases in the sitcom. Her most frequently used catch phrase in the series was "Good Lord!" also occasionally stated in alternate ways, such as "Good Lord in heaven!" "Well Good Lord!" or "Good night Louise!" Additional catch phrases of Mama's included "Horse pucky!" "Now hear this!" "Hell's bells!" "God-awful!" "The hell you say!" "(insert the sender's claim or statement here) my aunt Fanny!" "Smut," "For heaven's sake!" "For crying out loud!" "In a pig's eye!" "In a pig's patoot!"  "Shoot!" "Real good," "Oh I bet the neighbors are just lovin' this," etc. Thelma also had a series of name-calling catch phrases she often used to refer to certain members of her family or her family as a whole, such as "Nitwit," "Dimwit," "Goon," "Goober Goon," "Lamebrain," "Dunce," "Tramp," etc.

Evolution of family members' personas
Unlike the ill-tempered and stormy personalities alongside Mama in "The Family" sketches and the assertive and forceful personalities in the first incarnation of Mama's Family, the supporting characters in the reincarnated first-run syndicated version of Mama's Family weren't as quarrelsome or assertive with Mama. Due to the supporting characters' more easily subjugated natures and Mama's own adjustments, the reincarnation of Mama's Family was much more lighthearted, less serious, and less contentious than all previous Thelma & family broadcasts. There are some moments, however, in the sitcom's reincarnation in which the supporting characters band together against Mama with petulant complaints and finger-pointing at her, causing heated arguments to ensue.

Mama's familial and life history 
In "The Family" sketches, Thelma and her late husband, Carl Harper, have five children: Ellen, Eunice, Philip Harper, Larry, and Jack. This created marked plotholes as in the "Eunice" TV movie, they have three children: Ellen, Eunice, and Phillip Harper. In Mama's Family, they have three children, but the character of Phillip is replaced by Vinton. Thelma's husband, Carl, is a deceased character in all three broadcasts. He's only present in flashbacks as an unseen character, portrayed in voice only. In the movie Eunice Carl was voiced by Dick Clair and was heard from the main floor bathroom. Thelma is in her late sixties during "Mama's Family." (Vicki Lawrence was in her thirties during this time and would not turn sixty until 2009.)

Thelma's squabbles, resulting from her ingratitude and spite for her daughter Eunice and Eunice's husband, Ed, was the ongoing theme of "The Family" sketches.

In Mama's Family, Thelma lived originally with her sister, newspaper writer Fran Crowley. In the first episode, Vinton and his two children, Vinton "Buzz" Harper Jr. and Sonja Harper, move in with Thelma after being evicted from their house. Vinton has just gone through a divorce from a woman named Mitzi, who moved to Las Vegas to become a cocktail waitress.

Vinton soon marries Naomi Harper, Thelma's next door neighbor, whom Thelma despises. Thelma becomes so enraptured and relieved to find out Naomi, Vint and the kids are going to move to Arizona to run a trailer park, that she consents to having them marry in her living room. Following the wedding, they all return to Thelma's house to stay because Naomi's partner in the trailer park venture has absconded with every cent of Vint and Naomi's life's savings and had never actually owned a trailer park.

Thelma's relationships with her grandchildren are different than those with her children. She gets along rather well with Buzz, since he isn't always worrying her into the grave, the way his older sister does and Thelma's own children had done when they were younger.

Thelma is best friends with her neighbor across the street, Iola Boylan, who is crazy about Vinton and agrees with Thelma that Naomi wasn't the right kind of wife for him. In fact, Iola, who did not appear in the NBC episodes but makes her debut in the first episode of the third season, thinks she would be Vint's perfect mate. Thelma and Iola spend a great deal of time together, and Iola often comes over for dinner when she isn't helping her eccentric and infirmed parents. Although they are best friends, Iola and Thelma do have their share of disagreements as well, most of which are instigated by outside forces.

After Buzz and Sonja move out of the house for parts unknown and Fran dies in 1986, Thelma is joined by her other grandson, Bubba, Eunice and Ed's son. Her relationship with him is vastly different from the one she had with Buzz. Bubba is his mother's son, and while not as contentious and selfish as Eunice was, he is just as headstrong and stubborn, although he matured as the series progressed. He makes no fan of his Uncle Vint and Aunt Naomi when he is given Fran's old bedroom, meaning their bedroom will remain in the basement. Thelma did this because she wanted his bedroom to be next to hers, enabling her to keep better watch over him. However, with Bubba's parents having left him in Raytown while moving to Florida without telling him, Vint and Naomi were not about to begrudge him a bedroom.

Thelma has a very strong aversion to her grandchildren drinking to excess. In one instance, when Bubba comes home drunk after several beers, she punished him harshly. At first, nobody in her family understands why, considering that she regularly drinks beer, until Iola tells everyone about a terrible situation with Bubba's mother, Eunice. During a Mother-Daughter banquet several years before, presumably in the 1950s, Eunice showed up quite intoxicated. Then, during a song, Eunice and Thelma started having a violent argument on stage, during which Mama revealed to everyone present the circumstances under which Eunice was conceived. (Mama: "If your daddy hadn't gotten me as drunk as you are now, you never would have been!") Such a statement might explain the rancor between Thelma and Eunice. Taking the story to heart, Bubba makes a tearful and heartfelt apology to Thelma, swearing off beer from that point forward, and Thelma, seeing how remorseful Bubba was for the incident, gladly forgives him and lifts his punishment.

Thelma's embattled relationship with Eunice was not unlike the somewhat contentious relationship she had with her own mother. In her mind, Thelma's mother had no liking for anything Thelma did. In an episode where she deals with her own austere mother who haunts her for entertaining the idea of selling her brooch, Thelma calls her the same epithet that Eunice sometimes uses on her: "Old lady". At the end of the episode, Thelma's mother's haunting ends when Thelma sells the brooch, and then screams at her mother's apparition, "Get the hell out of my life!"

Thelma has held various jobs in Raytown. She works with Meals on Wheels; had a short stint as Mayor of Raytown, worked at a travel agency (for less than a day), worked at the local grocery store, "Food Circus", went to night school and also worked at a fast food restaurant.

One of Thelma's lifelong dreams is to go to Hawaii. She gets her wish when she appears on Jeopardy! While Thelma loses the main part of the competition, she does win a Hawaiian vacation as a consolation prize. The next two-part episode features Thelma, Iola, Vint, Naomi and Bubba's adventures in Hawaii.

As a former president of the Church Ladies League, Thelma has to deal with the ladies of the church, including the gossipy pastor's wife, Alberta Meechum, who brazenly tries to break up Thelma and Iola's friendship by suggesting that Iola run for president of the CLL. (Mrs. Meechum did this because Thelma had helped Alberta's husband spank their grandson, Little Eugene, for causing trouble for the Harpers and for kicking her husband in his sore leg. In her mind, Little Eugene was an angel, and helping to hurt him was a huge "no-no".) Neither Thelma nor Iola wins and Thelma's eventual successor is a woman named Lolly Perdue (first played by Doris Hess and later Marge Redmond), who wins because she was the only person big enough to separate the squabbling Thelma and Iola. Some time later, Lolly is the target of an impeachment attempt by Thelma and Iola, but they end up backing down when they discover Lolly is illiterate. Thelma also has to contend with Reverend Lloyd Meechum, the man who married Vint and Naomi, although he has no real grudge against her like his wife.. She also babysat their grandson, a little demon named Eugene, with disastrous results.

Thelma was known for her somewhat uneasy relations with her neighbors, going back to when Naomi lived next door. Most of her neighbors wouldn't mind seeing her and her entire dysfunctional family move away and never come back. A large part of this animosity came about during an aborted attempt to knock down the neighborhood and replace it with a landfill. To Thelma's shock, the house she had lived in since she was married had once been a brothel where the town's founder, James A. Ray, died. Thus, it was made a Raytown historical landmark, to mayor Alvin Tutweiler's chagrin, and her neighbors ire. They wanted a lot of money to leave that neighborhood and lose Thelma as a neighbor, but it was not to be. Even Iola was irate.

Post-Mama's Family appearances

Lawrence has resurrected the character of Thelma (still in her late sixties) several times on the game show Hollywood Squares, on stage in her two-woman show, on her talk show in the early 1990s, on the TNN talk show Primetime Country and in the 2008 TV Land Awards, and on numerous comedy tours.

Thelma "wrote" a book in 2008 entitled Mama for President.

Thelma also appeared on Are You Smarter Than a 5th Grader? on October 2, 2009 playing for charity. She ended up winning $8,000 USD, getting nine out of ten questions correct, and opted not to answer the eleventh question (the bonus question), as missing that question results in a loss of all the player's winnings.

On October 29, 2012, Thelma was seen once again on Logo's RuPaul's Drag Race: All Stars as the special comedian in which the contestants had to interact and have a comedic sketch. Later seen out of the Thelma persona, Vicki Lawrence played as a special guest judge to the contestants alongside RuPaul.

On February 5, 2013, Thelma appeared in a special sketch during Betty White's 2nd Annual 90th Birthday in honor of Betty White. The sketch features a Beverly Hills high school class reunion with three of Betty's "classmates" from 1939. The sketch has a run time just over two minutes.

MeTV's insertion of Mama's Family into their 2015–2016 schedule also brought with it several new video spots of Vicki Lawrence as Thelma Harper, used for bumpers and promotional commercials on the network.

References

Television characters introduced in 1974
Mama's Family characters
Female characters in television
Comedy television characters